The marsh wren (Cistothorus palustris) is a small North American songbird of the wren family. It is sometimes called the long-billed marsh wren to distinguish it from the sedge wren, also known as the short-billed marsh wren.

Taxonomy
The marsh wren was described by the Scottish-American ornithologist Alexander Wilson in 1810 and given the binomial name Certhia palustris. The current genus Cistothorus was introduced by the German ornithologist Jean Cabanis in 1850. There are 15 recognised subspecies.

Etymology: from Greek 'κιστος' (cistos, "a shrub") and 'θουρος' (thouros, "leaping, or running through") and Latin 'palustris' ("marshy").

Description

Adults have brown upperparts with a light brown belly and flanks and a white throat and breast. The back is black with white stripes. They have a dark cap with a white line over the eyes and a short thin bill.

The male's song is a loud gurgle used to declare ownership of territory; western males have a more varied repertoire.

This little bird is native to Canada, Mexico, and the United States. Their breeding habitat is marshes with tall vegetation such as cattails across North America. In the western United States, some birds are permanent residents. Other birds migrate to marshes and salt marshes in the southern United States and Mexico. their non-breeding range is in the southern United States going into Mexico and their breeding range is in the northeastern United States going into Canada.

Measurements:

 Length: 
 Weight: 
 Wingspan:

Foraging and diet 
These birds forage actively in vegetation close to the water, occasionally flying up to catch insects in flight. They mainly eat insects, also spiders and snails. In California, 53 Western Marsh Wren stomachs were examined which showed that the birds consume bugs (29%), caterpillars and chrysalids (17%), beetles (16%), ants and wasps (8%), spiders (5%), carabids and coccinellids (2%), with various other flies, grasshoppers, dragonflies and unidentifiable insect remains making up over 11 percent. Ants and wasps were observed to be mostly eaten in the fall.

Nesting 
The nest is an oval structure attached to marsh vegetation, entered from the side. The male builds many unused nests in his territory. A hypothesis of the possible reason to why males build multiple "dummy" nests in their territory is that they are courting areas and that the females construct the "breeding nest" in which she lays her eggs. He may puncture the eggs and fatally peck the nestlings of other birds nesting nearby, including his own species (even his own offspring) and red-winged blackbirds, yellow-headed blackbirds, and least bitterns. The clutch is normally four to six eggs, though the number can range from three to 10. The eggs are usually 0.6-0.7 inches in length and 0.4-0.6 inches in width. Incubation is performed only by females, and only females develop a brood patch. Marsh wren young can get infected by pathogenic larvae. The Blowfly larvae infect the young by subdermal myiasis-induced lesions and subsequent sepsis. The larvae form a wound in the young by rasping and expanding a hole in their skin to create blood flow and feed on the blood of the hosts' body.

Conservation 
The species is still common with an estimated global breeding population of 9.4 million. However, its numbers have declined with the loss of suitable wetland habitat and wholesale draining of marshes will lead to local extinction. Still, the species is widespread enough not to qualify as threatened according to the IUCN.

Gallery

References

Citations

General sources 
 Henninger, W. F. (1906): "A preliminary list of the birds of Seneca County, Ohio". Wilson Bull. 18(2): 47–60. DjVu full text PDF full text
 Warren, Yvonne. "Protocalliphora Braueri (Diptera: Calliphoridae) Induced Pathogenesis in a Brood of Marsh Wren (Cistothorus Palustris) Young". Journal of Wildlife Diseases, 17 Mar. 1993. .

Further reading

External links

 Identification tips—USGS Patuxent Bird Identification InfoCenter
 
 
 

marsh wren
Birds of North America
marsh wren
Taxa named by Alexander Wilson (ornithologist)